Magnet is a commune in the Allier department in central France.

Population

See also
Communes of the Allier department

References

External links 
 Town hall website 

Communes of Allier
Allier communes articles needing translation from French Wikipedia